Skyline Plaza is a building complex in the western part of Frankfurt, Germany, near the trade fair premises of Messe Frankfurt. It is planned to consist of four buildings: 

 a shopping mall with around 180 shops and restaurants (opened on 29 August 2013) and a large spa (opening scheduled for February 2014)
 a congress center for Messe Frankfurt (opening scheduled for June 2014)
 a  office tower (under construction)
 Grand Tower: a  residential tower (finished)

Location 
The complex is located on a site which housed Frankfurt's central goods station until 1998. The whole area, including the former railroad tracks, has since been developed into a new housing and business area called Europaviertel. The Skyline Plaza complex borders the Frankfurt trade fair premises and the Messeturm to the north.

Buildings

Shopping mall and spa 
The oval-shaped building with a total of 38,000 square meters of sales floor on two levels and around 2,400 parking spaces opened on 29 August 2013. A unique attraction is a public park-like area on top of the building with a restaurant, a playground and green areas (Skyline Garden). A separate fitness and spa area, operated by MeridianSpa, opened on 1 February 2014.

Congress center Kap Europa 
The congress center is used by Messe Frankfurt and offers 14 meeting rooms for up to 2,400 people. It is the only building used by Messe Frankfurt that is located outside the actual trade fair grounds. It opened in May 2014.

Office tower ONE Frankfurt 
A  office tower, designed by French architect Jean Nouvel, is planned for the north corner of the Skyline Plaza site. The construction is planned to start in 2017 and to be completed in 2022.

Residential tower Grand Tower 
In 2008 Hyatt Hotels Corporation signed a contract to build a luxury 110m Grand Hyatt hotel tower on the site. The proposed design was created by UNStudio. In 2013 Hyatt dropped out of the project.

In April 2014, the Grand Tower, a residential tower with a height of 160m was proposed instead. In March 2016, the construction began, with an increased height of 180m, and was completed in June 2020.

Public transport 
Skyline Plaza is well accessible with the public transport system. Nearby are the stations: 
  Festhalle/Messe
  16 17 Festhalle/Messe 
  11 14 21 Güterplatz

References

External links
 Skyline Plaza official website
 Present and history of the mall explained by SKYLINE ATLAS

Shopping malls in Germany
Buildings and structures in Frankfurt
Tourist attractions in Frankfurt